The national flag of the Netherlands is a horizontal tricolour of red, white, and blue. The current design originates as a variant of the late 16th century orange-white-blue Prinsenvlag ("Prince's Flag"), evolving in the early 17th century as the red-white-blue Statenvlag ("States Flag"), the naval flag of the States-General of the Dutch Republic, making the Dutch flag perhaps the oldest tricolour flag in continuous use. As a flag that symbolises the transformation from monarchy to republic, it has inspired both the derivative Russian flag, and after the French Revolution in 1789 the vertically striped French tricolour, both flags in turn influenced many other tricolours.
During the economic crisis of the 1930s, the old Prince's Flag with the colour orange gained some popularity among some people. To end the confusion, the colours red, white and blue and its official status as the national flag of the Kingdom of the Netherlands were reaffirmed by royal decree on 19 February 1937.

Description
The national flag of the Netherlands is a tricolour flag. The horizontal fesses are bands of equal size in the colours from top to bottom, red (officially described as a "bright vermilion"), white (silver), and blue ("cobalt blue"). The flag proportions (width:length) are 2:3. The color parameters were defined in November 1958 by the NEN (former HCNN) in as the following:
 

In this definition, the colors are defined using CIE-1931 colour space and Standard illuminant C at a 45° angle.

The Dutch flag is almost identical to that of Luxembourg, except that it is shorter and its red and blue stripes are a darker shade. The similarity of the two flags has given rise to a national debate to change the flag of Luxembourg, initiated by Michel Wolter in 2006.

Symbolism

Each band of color in the Dutch flag holds some symbolism for the country. The red band symbolizes bravery, strength, valor, and hardiness; the white band, peace and honesty; and the blue band represents vigilance, truth, loyalty, perseverance, and justice.

Another theory as to why the Dutch flag has these colours is because some researchers claim that they used to be a symbol of society: red symbolises the people, white the church and blue the nobility.

History

Middle Ages 

At the end of the 15th century, when the majority of the Netherlands provinces were united under the Duke of Burgundy, the Cross of Burgundy flag of the Duke of Burgundy was used for joint expeditions, which consisted of a red saltire resembling two crossed, roughly-pruned (knotted) branches, on a white field. Under the later House of Habsburg this flag remained in use.

Prince's Flag

In 1568 provinces of the Low Countries rose in revolt against King Philip II of Spain, and Prince William of Orange (1533–1584) placed himself at the head of the rebels. The etymology of the House of Orange is unrelated to the name of the fruit or the colour. Usage of the colours orange, white and blue (Dutch: Oranje, Wit, Blauw, from French Orange, Blanc, Bleu) was based on the livery of William and was first recorded in the siege of Leiden in 1574, when Dutch officers wore orange-white-blue brassards. The first known full color depiction of the flag appeared in 1575 (see image). In Ghent in 1577, William was welcomed with a number of theatrical allegories represented by a young girl wearing orange, blue and white. The first explicit reference to a naval flag in these colours is found in the ordonnances of the Admiralty of Zeeland, dated 1587, i.e. shortly after William's death. 

The colour combination of orange, white, and blue is commonly considered the first Dutch flag. The 400th anniversary of the introduction of the Dutch flag was commemorated in the Netherlands by the issue of a postage stamp in 1972. That was based on the fact that in 1572 the Watergeuzen (Gueux de mer, "Sea Beggars"), the pro-Dutch privateers, captured Den Briel in name of William, Prince of Orange. However, it is uncertain whether they took an orange-white-blue flag with them on the event, although they certainly started using an orange-white-blue tricolour somewhat later in the 1570s. It became later known as the Prinsenvlag ("Prince's flag") and served as the basis for the former South African flag, the flags of New York City and the Flag of Albany, New York, all three former dominions of the Dutch Republic.

Statenvlag

Red as replacement for orange appeared as early as 1596, but more often after about 1630, as indicated by paintings of that time. Red gradually replaced orange (1630–60) as a sign of political change and growing dissociation of the Republic from the House of Orange. It appears that prior to 1664, the red-white-blue tricolour was commonly known as the "Flag of Holland" (Hollandsche Vlag); named after one of the revolting provinces. In 1664, the States of Zeeland, one of the other revolting provinces, complained about this, and a resolution of the States-General introduced the name "States Flag" (Statenvlag), which the red, white and blue tricolor will be known hereafter. The Dutch navy between 1588 and 1630 had always displayed the Prince's Flag, and after 1663 always the States Flag, with both flag variants being in use during the period of 1630–1662.

The red-white-blue triband flag as used in the 17th century is said to have influenced the designs of both the seminal Russian flag and the French flag. In turn, these two flags would later influence many others.

Flag of the Batavian Republic

With the Batavian Revolution in the Netherlands in the last decade of the 18th century, and the subsequent conquest by the French, the name "Prince's Flag" was forbidden and the red-white-blue of the Statenvlag was the only flag allowed, analogous as it was to France's own tricolour, chosen just a few months earlier, ironically influenced by that same Statenvlag. In 1796 the red division of the flag was embellished with the figure of a Netherlands maiden, with a lion at her feet, in the upper left corner. In one hand she bore a shield with the Roman fasces and in the other a lance crowned with the cap of liberty. This flag had a life as short as that of the Batavian Republic for which it was created.
Louis Bonaparte, made king of Holland by his brother the Emperor Napoleon, wished to pursue a purely Dutch policy and to respect national sentiments as much as possible. He removed the maiden of freedom from the flag and restored the old tricolour. His pro-Dutch policies led to conflicts with his brother, however, and the Netherlands were incorporated into the French Empire. In 1810 its flag was replaced by the imperial emblems.

Modern flag
In 1813, the Netherlands regained its independence and the Prince of Orange returned from exile and contemporary newspapers report that the red-white-blue flag was flown decorated with an orange Pennon/pennant and solid‐coloured orange flags were displayed in many places in the country as a sign of allegiance of the people to the House of Orange.

Just before the outbreak of World War II, the Prince's flag resurfaced again. Some people were convinced that orange, white, and blue were the true colours of the Dutch flag, particularly members of the National Socialist Movement in the Netherlands. To end the discussion, a royal decree established the colours of the Dutch flag as: 'The colours of the flag of the Kingdom of the Netherlands are red, white and blue' (Dutch: De kleuren van de vlag van het Koninkrijk der Nederlanden zijn rood, wit en blauw). It became the shortest decree in history, and was issued by Queen Wilhelmina on 19 February 1937. 

It was only on 16 August 1949 that the exact colour parameters were defined by the Ministry of the Navy as bright vermilion (red), white and cobalt blue. The pennant is usually added on King's Day (Dutch: Koningsdag, 27 April) or other festive occasions related to the Royal Family.

Display and use

The flag is customarily flown at government buildings and military bases in the Netherlands and abroad all year round. Private use is more uncommon. Only on national holidays is there widespread private use. At the birthdays or weddings of specific members of the Royal House, an orange pennant is added to the flag. There are special non-holiday festivities or remembrance occasions when the flag is flown, such as at the homes of students who have just graduated. The flag is then often accompanied by the graduate's school bag hung from the tip of the flagpole. The flag can also be displayed at times of sadness at half-mast (or a black pennant is added to the flag when hanging at half-mast is not possible) as a sign of respect or national mourning.

There are a number of flag flying days in the Netherlands. The holidays on which flags are put out by the government, according to the flag instruction, are:

The dates mentioned in parentheses are the dates when the flags are put out, should the original scheduled flag day fall on a Sunday, when possible. Exceptions are Remembrance of the Dead and Liberation Day, should one of them fall on a Sunday, the flags are put out anyway.

The prime minister of the Netherlands is responsible for announcing updates to the flag instruction (last given in 2013 when Queen's Day on 30 April became King's Day on 27 April), announcing one-off flag days (last given on 19 March 2019 to remember the Utrecht tram shooting), and announcing one-off modifications to the current flag days (last given in 2020 when the flags were put out at half-mast on 4 May the whole day instead of from 18:00, due to the 75-year anniversary of the liberation of the Netherlands and the COVID-19 pandemic).

When a member of the Dutch Royal House is born, the flag instruction will be determined some weeks before the child is expected. In the most recent occasions – in 2003, 2005 and 2007, when Princess Máxima was expecting Princess Amalia, Princess Alexia and Princess Ariane respectively, it was announced that immediately upon announcement of the birth, the flags would be put out with the orange pennant. However, because Amalia and Ariane were born while darkness already fell (and Amalia was born on a Sunday), the flag day was postponed until the next day.

Flags of current countries in the Kingdom of the Netherlands

Flag of Aruba

The national flag of Aruba was officially adopted on 18 March 1976. The blue field represents the sky, the sea, peace, hope, Aruba's future and its ties to the past. The two narrow stripes "suggest the movement toward status aparte". One represents "the flow of tourists to sun-drenched Aruba, enriching the island as well as vacationers", the other "industry, all the minerals (gold and phosphates in the past, petroleum in the early 20th century)". In addition to sun, gold, and abundance, the yellow is also said to represent wanglo flowers. The star has particularly complex symbolism. It is vexillologically unusual in having four points, representing the four cardinal directions. These refer in turn to the many countries of origin of the people of Aruba. They also represent the four main languages of Aruba: Papiamento, Spanish, English, and Dutch. The star also represents the island itself: a land of often red soil bordered by white beaches in a blue sea. The red also represents blood shed by Arubans during war, past Indian inhabitants, patriotic love, and Brazil wood. The white also represents purity and honesty.

Flag of Curaçao

The flag of Curaçao is a blue field with a horizontal yellow stripe slightly below the midline and two white, five-pointed stars in the canton. The blue symbolises the sea and sky (the bottom and top blue sections, respectively) divided by a yellow stroke representing the bright sun which bathes the island. The two stars represent Curaçao and Klein Curaçao, but also 'Love & Happiness'. The five points on each star symbolise the five continents from which Curaçao's people come.

Flag of Sint Maarten

The flag of Sint Maarten is the national flag of the Dutch part of Saint Martin island, which is a country within the Kingdom of the Netherlands. It was adopted on 13 June 1985. It resembles the war flag of the Philippines.

Flags of former countries in the Kingdom of the Netherlands

Suriname 

The pre-independence flag of Suriname consisted of five coloured stars (from top left clockwise: white, black, brown, yellow, and red) connected by an ellipse. The coloured stars represent the major ethnic groups that comprise the Surinamese population: the original Amerindians, the colonising Europeans, the Africans brought in as slaves to work in plantations and the Indians, Javanese and Chinese who came as indentured workers to replace the Africans who escaped slavery and settled in the hinterland. The ellipse represents the harmonious relationship amongst the groups.

Netherlands Antilles

Within the flag of the Netherlands Antilles there were five stars that symbolise the five islands that made up the country. While the colours red, white and blue refer to the flag of the Netherlands. A six-star version was used until 1986 when Aruba became its own country within the Kingdom. This original version was adopted on 19 November 1959.
This flag fell into disuse when the Netherlands Antilles was dissolved on 10 October 2010.
The islands of Sint Maarten and Curaçao obtained their separate country status within the Kingdom and the islands Bonaire, St. Eustatius and Saba are now overseas entities of the Netherlands.

Flags of former colonies of the Kingdom of the Netherlands

New Holland (Brazil)
The flag of New Holland, also known as the flag of Dutch Brazil, was the flag used by the Dutch West India Company for the territories that were under its control in Brazil from 1630 until 1654.

The flag consists of three horizontal stripes in the colours of the flag of the Republic of the Seven United Netherlands (red, white and blue) and it displays a monogram on the central stripe and a crown on the upper stripe, both gold-coloured. The origin of the monogram as well as its initials and its meaning is not known.

Netherlands East Indies

For the majority of the existence of the Netherlands East Indies the flag of the Vereenigde Oost-Indische Compagnie (English: Dutch East India Company) was used. When the VOC became bankrupt and was formally dissolved in 1800. its possessions and debt were taken over by the government of the Batavian Republic. The VOC's territories became the Netherlands East Indies and were expanded over the course of the 19th century to include the whole of the Indonesian archipelago. As such the flag of the Batavian Republic and Kingdom of the Netherlands were used.

The flag of the Netherlands has been said to be the origin of the Indonesian flag. To symbolise the intention of forcing out the Dutch, the Indonesian nationalists would rip apart the Dutch flag. They tore off the bottom third of the flag, and separated the red and white colours from the blue colour.

Netherlands New Guinea

The Morning Star flag represented the Netherlands New Guinea from 1 December 1961 until 1 October 1962 when the territory came under administration of the United Nations Temporary Executive Authority (UNTEA). The flag is commonly used by the West Papuan population including OPM (Free Papua Movement) supporters to rally self-determination human rights support and is popularly flown on 1 December each year in defiance of Indonesian domestic laws. The flag consists of a red vertical band along the hoist side, with a white five-pointed star in the center. The flag was first raised on 1 December 1961 and used until the United Nations became the territory's administrator on 1 October 1962.

Related flags

Flags influenced by the flag of the Netherlands
The flags below are influenced by the Dutch flag in colour use and design as a result of a shared history (as flags of former colonies) or economic relations, which is the case for the Russian flag.
 The flag of the Boer Republics, Transvaal, the Orange Free State and Natalia Republic and the flag of South Africa from 1928 to 1994 are all based on the flag of the Netherlands, or the predecessor Prince's flag. These were in turn part of the inspiration for the present South African flag.
 The flag of Hesse-Nassau is identical to that of the Netherlands. The Dutch royal house originates from the Duchy of Nassau.
 The flag of Shanghai Municipal Council in Shanghai International Settlement included multiple flags to symbolize the countries have participated in the creation and management of this enclave in the Chinese city of Shanghai. The Dutch flag was put along with old Swedish civil ensign (spread vertically), the Austrian flag and old Spanish merchant ensign at the lower shield, and all of them were upside down.
 The flag of New York City, originally New Amsterdam in the Dutch colony New Netherland, was designed after the Dutch flag.
 The flag of Albany originally Beverwijck in the Dutch colony New Netherland, was designed after the Dutch flag.
 The flag of Schenectady County, New York, was designed after the Dutch flag.
 The flag of Nimba County, Liberia similar to the Dutch flag, superimposed with Liberian flag in the canton.
 The flag of Labuan and flag of Johor Bahru in Malaysia similar to the Dutch flag, with a crescent and star in the center.
 The flag of Chin National Front in Myanmar similar to the Dutch flag, with two hornbills in the center.
 The flag of Jersey City was designed after the Dutch flag.

Pan-Slavic colours

The Russian flag in turn is believed to have influenced many flags of other Slavic countries, resulting in many red-white-blue styled tribands in other parts of Europe. Peter the Great of Russia was building a new Russian Navy mostly on Dutch standards; therefore the Russian merchant flag at sea would be the inverted colours of the Dutch flag.

See also 
 Flags of provinces of the Netherlands
 List of Dutch flags
 Flags of the Dutch royal family
 Dutch national flag problem

References

External links 

Netherlands
 
National symbols of the Netherlands
Netherlands